Villahermosa is a town and municipality in the Tolima department of Colombia.  The population of the municipality was 12,574 as of the 1993 census. The municipality is also one of the most important coffee producers of Tolima's north.

Climate
Villahermosa has a subtropical highland climate (Cfb). It has heavy rainfall year-round.

References

Municipalities of Tolima Department